Alessandro Mariotti (born 5 November 1998 in San Marino) is a San Marinese Alpine Skier. He is the sole competitor for San Marino at the 2018 Winter Olympics.

Olympic Events
Mariotti contended at the European Youth Olympic Festival in Malbun, Liechtenstein in 2015. He ranked overall 37th in the slalom and 57th in the Giant Slalom.

Mariotti competed in the slalom and giant slalom for San Marino at the 2016 Winter Youth Olympics in Lillehammer, Norway. He came in 30th in the giant slalom and 32nd in the slalom.

FIS tournaments
He made appearances at FIS World Ski Championships in both Vail, Colorado in 2015, and St. Moritz, Switzerland in 2017. He came in 90th and 52nd in the giant slalom respectively.

Mariotti also participated in several FIS tournaments where in December 2017, he ranked 20th in slalom in Ravna planina, Bosnia and Herzegovina. A week later, Mariotti ranked 11th and 14th in slalom and 12th and 14th in giant slalom at Kolašin, Montenegro.

2018 Winter Olympics
On 27 January 2018, at a press conference, it was announced that Mariotti qualified to compete in the 2018 Winter Olympics and will be the sole representative from San Marino. He will participate in the men's giant slalom. Mariotti was the flag bearer for San Marino in the 2018 Winter Olympics Parade of Nations.

References

Sammarinese male alpine skiers
1998 births
Olympic alpine skiers of San Marino
Living people
Alpine skiers at the 2018 Winter Olympics
Alpine skiers at the 2016 Winter Youth Olympics